The women's javelin throw at the 2019 Asian Athletics Championships was held on 21 April.

Results

References
Results

Javelin
Javelin throw at the Asian Athletics Championships
2019 in women's athletics